391 was a Dada-affiliated arts and literary magazine created by Francis Picabia, published between 1917 and 1924 in Barcelona, Zürich and New York City.

History and profile
The magazine was created by the Dadaist Francis Picabia. Picabia produced the first four issues, which Dalmau published. He was assisted in assembling the magazine by Olga Sacharoff, a Georgian emigre residing in Barcelona.

The title of the magazine derives from Alfred Stieglitz's New York periodical 291 (to which Picabia had contributed), and bore no relation to its contents. Despite Picabia's renown as an artist, it was mostly literary in content, with a wide-ranging aggressive tone, possibly influenced by Alfred Jarry and Guillaume Apollinaire. There were contributions by Marie Laurencin, Man Ray and Marcel Duchamp. However 391 remained essentially the expression of the inventive, energetic and wealthy Picabia, who stated of it: "Every page must explode, whether through seriousness, profundity, turbulence, nausea, the new, the eternal, annihilating nonsense, enthusiasm for principles, or the way it is printed. Art must be unaesthetic in the extreme, useless and impossible to justify."

Starting from its fifth issue the magazine was published in New York City. Its eighth issue was published in Zurich. Then the magazine was published in Paris until 1924 when its last issue, number 19, was distributed.

See also
 List of magazines in Spain
 List of avant-garde magazines

References

Further reading
 Richter, Hans. Dada: Art and Anti-Art (Thames & Hudson 1965)

External links
Downloadable pages from several issues of 391
391.org, a modern version of the magazine

1917 establishments in Spain
1924 disestablishments in Spain
Avant-garde magazines
Contemporary art magazines
Dada
Defunct literary magazines published in Europe
Defunct magazines published in Spain
Design magazines
Literary magazines published in Spain
Magazines established in 1917
Magazines disestablished in 1924
Magazines published in Barcelona
Magazines published in New York City
Magazines published in Zürich
Poetry literary magazines
Spanish-language magazines
Visual arts magazines published in the United States